José Asensio Lamiel (29 January 1924 – 26 August 2020) was an Aragonese painter and sculptor born in Calanda in the Spanish comarca of Bajo Aragón.

Biography 
He began his studies at the School of Applied Arts and Crafts in Zaragoza. A scholarship allowed him to study at the San Carlos Royal Academy of Fine Arts in Valencia, and then at the San Fernando Royal Academy of Fine Arts in Madrid. In the 1960s he moved to Colombia and worked there for six years; he also worked in the United States, before returning to Spain, where he set up residence in Madrid, and continued to develop as painter and sculptor. In 1989 he was awarded the Cruz de San Jorge by the provincial government of Teruel.

Gallery

Bibliography 
Diccionario Antológico de Artistas Aragoneses 1947–1978, Institución Fernando el Católico, Zaragoza, 1983.

See also 
 Museo de Escultura al Aire Libre de Alcalá de Henares

External links 
 José Antonio Bielsa: José Lamiel en El poder de la palabra (Spanish)

1924 births
2020 deaths
20th-century Spanish painters
Spanish male painters
21st-century Spanish painters
Spanish male sculptors
People from Calanda
Sculptors from Aragon
20th-century Spanish sculptors
21st-century Spanish sculptors
20th-century Spanish male artists
Spanish expatriates in Colombia
Spanish expatriates in the United States
21st-century Spanish male artists